Victor Carbone (born September 13, 1992) is a Brazilian racing driver from São Paulo.

After karting, Carbone participated in the Skip Barber National Championship in 2008 and finished 15th. In 2009 he drove in the F2000 Championship Series for Alegra Motorsports and finished 10th in points. Carbone returned to the team and series in 2010 and won the title, winning 6 of the 14 races.

In 2011 he signed on with defending Firestone Indy Lights series champions Sam Schmidt Motorsports to race in Indy Lights. He won the final race of the season at Las Vegas Motor Speedway and had another podium finish at Baltimore and finished sixth in points. He returned to Sam Schmidt Motorsports and the Indy Lights series in 2012 and again finished sixth in points, this time without a race win, but with a pair of podium finishes, a pole, and a strong showing in the Freedom 100 where he led the most laps.

Racing record

American open–wheel racing results
(key)

Indy Lights

Complete GP3 Series results
(key) (Races in bold indicate pole position) (Races in italics indicate fastest lap)

References

1992 births
Brazilian racing drivers
Indy Lights drivers
Living people
Brazilian GP3 Series drivers
Racing drivers from São Paulo

Arrow McLaren SP drivers
Team Moore Racing drivers
Trident Racing drivers